Chemokine (C-X-C motif) ligand 6 (CXCL6) is a small cytokine belonging to the CXC chemokine family that is also known as granulocyte chemotactic protein 2 (GCP-2). As its former name suggests, CXCL6 is a chemoattractant for neutrophilic granulocytes. It elicits its chemotactic effects by interacting with the chemokine receptors CXCR1 and CXCR2.  The gene for CXCL6 is located on human chromosome 4 in a cluster with other CXC chemokine genes.

References

Cytokines